Miguel Ángel Cáceres Báez (born June 6, 1978) is a former Paraguayan footballer.

Career
Caceres scored a goal in a friendly match vs Australia in 2000.

|}

References

External links
 

Paraguayan footballers
1978 births
Living people
Association football forwards
Paraguay international footballers
Rosario Central footballers
Levante UD footballers
CD Badajoz players
Nueva Chicago footballers